Louis Deshayes, Baron de Courmemin, born in 1600 and died on 12 October 12, 1632, was a French diplomat.

Biography 
Advisor to Louis XIII, he was sent on several missions to the Levant, Denmark, Safavid Iran and the Tsardom of Russia.

Having joined a conspiracy against Cardinal Richelieu, he was arrested under the orders of his rival Hercules de Charnacé, at Mainz. and beheaded at Béziers in 1632.

Works 
 Voyage du Levant, fait par le commandement du roi en 1621, Paris, 1624
 Voyages au Danemark, 1664.

Notes and references

Bibliography 
 Pierre Margry, Une ambassade des Français en Russie sous Louis XIII (1629), dans Revue maritime et coloniale, juillet 1861,  (lire en ligne -, erratum)

French diplomats